Hydnocarpus is a genus of medium to large trees in the Family Achariaceae; the genus was previously placed in the now defunct family Flacourtiaceae.  Species have been recorded from Indochina, Indonesia, Malaysia and the Philippines.

Characteristics
Hydnocarpus has alternate leaves, small dioecious racemose flowers, and capsules of which several are sources of chaulmoogra oil and hydnocarpus oil. A species of Hydnocarpus is thought to host to the Peacock mite Tuckerella filipina.

Species
Plants of the World Online currently includes:

 Dinesh oomburan
 Hydnocarpus alcalae C.DC.
 Hydnocarpus alpinus Wight (H.alpina)
 Hydnocarpus annamensis Lescot & Sleumer ex Harwood & B.L.Webber
 Hydnocarpus annamicus H.L.Li
 Hydnocarpus anomalus (Merr.) Sleumer
 Hydnocarpus beccarianus Sleumer
 Hydnocarpus borneensis Sleumer
 Hydnocarpus calophyllus (Ridl.) Sleumer
 Hydnocarpus calvipetalus Craib
 Hydnocarpus castaneus Hook.f. & Thomson
 synonym: Hydnocarpus anthelminticus (sic) Pierre ex Laness.
 Hydnocarpus cauliflorus Merr.
 Hydnocarpus corymbosus Seem.
 Hydnocarpus crassifolius Sleumer
 Hydnocarpus cucurbitinus King (H. cucurbitana)
 Hydnocarpus curtisii King
 Hydnocarpus dawnensis C.E.Parkinson & C.E.C.Fisch.
 Hydnocarpus elmeri Merr.
 Hydnocarpus filipes Symington & Sleumer
 Hydnocarpus glaucescens Blume
 Hydnocarpus gracilis (Slooten) Sleumer
 Hydnocarpus hainanensis (Merr.) Sleumer
 Hydnocarpus heterophyllus Blume
 Hydnocarpus humei Ridl.
 Hydnocarpus ilicifolius King
 Hydnocarpus kunstleri (King) Warb.
 Hydnocarpus kurzii (King) Warb. (= H. heterophyllus)
 Hydnocarpus longipedunculatus Robi, Sasidh. & Jose
 Hydnocarpus macrocarpus (Bedd.) Warb.
 Hydnocarpus merrillianus Sleumer
 Hydnocarpus nanus King (H. nana)
 Hydnocarpus octandrus Thwaites (H. octandra)
 Hydnocarpus pendulus Manilal, T.Sabu & Sivar.
 Hydnocarpus pentandrus (Buch.-Ham.) Oken
 synonym: Hydnocarpus wightianus Blume
 Hydnocarpus pinguis Sleumer
 Hydnocarpus polypetalus (Slooten) Sleumer
 Hydnocarpus saigonensis Pierre ex Gagnep.
 Hydnocarpus scortechinii King
 Hydnocarpus subfalcatus Merr.
 Hydnocarpus sumatranus (Miq.) Koord. (= H. hutchinsonii)
 Hydnocarpus tenuipetalus Sleumer
 Hydnocarpus venenatus Gaertn. (H. venetana) - type species
 Hydnocarpus verrucosus C.E.Parkinson & C.E.C.Fisch.
 Hydnocarpus woodii Merr.
 Hydnocarpus wrayi King
 Hydnocarpus yatesii Merr.

Note: A number of species were formerly in Taraktogenos.

References

 Multilingual multiscript plant name database

External links
 
 

 
Malpighiales genera
Dioecious plants